March 11 - Eastern Orthodox liturgical calendar - March 13

All fixed commemorations below are observed on March 25 by Orthodox Churches on the Old Calendar.

For March 12th, Orthodox Churches on the Old Calendar commemorate the Saints listed on February 27 (February 28 on leap years).

Saints

 Righteous Aaron the High Priest, brother of Prophet Moses the God-seer (c. 1530 BC)
 Righteous Phineas, grandson of Aaron (ca. 1500 BC)  (see also: September 2)
 Holy Nine Martyrs in the Persian Empire.
 Saint Cyrus (Abba-Cyr), monk of Alexandria (6th century)
 Saint Gregory the Dialogist, Pope of Rome (604)  (see also: September 3)
 Venerable Theophanes the Confessor of Sigriane (818)
 Venerable Saints Symeon the New Theologian (1022), and his elder, Symeon the Studite (Symeon the Reverent, the Pious), of the Studion (987)  (see also: October 12)

Pre-Schism Western saints

 Martyr Mamilian (Maximilian), in Rome.
 Martyr Maximilian of Tebessa, in Thebeste in Numidia, for refusing military service (295)
 Saint Paul Aurelian (Paul de Léon), Bishop of Léon in Brittany, Confessor (572)
 Saint Peter the Deacon, disciple, secretary and companion of St Gregory the Great, and patron-saint of Salussola in Italy (ca. 605)
 Saint Mura McFeredach (Muran, Murames), Abbot of Fahan in County Donegal, patron-saint of Fahan where his cross still stands (ca. 645)
 Saint Alphege (Ælfheah the Elder, Ælfheah the Bald), Bishop of Winchester, England (951)
 Saint Nicodemus of Mammola in Calabria (990)

Post-Schism Orthodox saints

 Venerable Lawrence the Martyr (Lavrentios), one of the "300 Allemagne Saints" in Cyprus (12th century)
 Martyr Demetrius the Devoted, King of Georgia (1289)
 Saint Stephen Dragutin of Serbia (monk Theoctistus Dragutin), (1316)

New martyrs and confessors

 Saint Alexander Derzhavin, Priest, Confessor (1933)
 New Hieromartyr Vladimir (Volkov), Archimandrite of Islavskoe (Moscow) (1938)
 New Hieromartyr John Plekhanov, Priest (1938)
 New Hieromartyr Sergius Skvortsov, Priest (1943)

Other commemorations

 Icon of the Most Holy Theotokos "Not-Made-by-Hands" (on the Pillar) at Lydda.
 Repose of Schema-monk Anthony the Gorge-dweller, of Zelenchug Monastery in Kuban (1908)
 Restoration of the Autocephaly of the  Georgian Orthodox and Apostolic Church (1917)

Icon gallery

Notes

References

Sources
 March 12/March 25. Orthodox Calendar (PRAVOSLAVIE.RU).
 March 25 / March 12. HOLY TRINITY RUSSIAN ORTHODOX CHURCH (A parish of the Patriarchate of Moscow).
 March 12. OCA - The Lives of the Saints.
 The Autonomous Orthodox Metropolia of Western Europe and the Americas (ROCOR). St. Hilarion Calendar of Saints for the year of our Lord 2004. St. Hilarion Press (Austin, TX). p. 21.
 March 12. Latin Saints of the Orthodox Patriarchate of Rome.
 Rev. Richard Stanton. A Menology of England and Wales, or, Brief Memorials of the Ancient British and English Saints Arranged According to the Calendar, Together with the Martyrs of the 16th and 17th Centuries. London: Burns & Oates, 1892. pp. 112–116.
 The Roman Martyrology. Transl. by the Archbishop of Baltimore. Last Edition, According to the Copy Printed at Rome in 1914. Revised Edition, with the Imprimatur of His Eminence Cardinal Gibbons. Baltimore: John Murphy Company, 1916. pp. 73–74.
Greek Sources
 Great Synaxaristes:  12 ΜΑΡΤΙΟΥ. ΜΕΓΑΣ ΣΥΝΑΞΑΡΙΣΤΗΣ.
  Συναξαριστής. 12 Μαρτίου. ECCLESIA.GR. (H ΕΚΚΛΗΣΙΑ ΤΗΣ ΕΛΛΑΔΟΣ).
Russian Sources
  25 марта (12 марта). Православная Энциклопедия под редакцией Патриарха Московского и всея Руси Кирилла (электронная версия). (Orthodox Encyclopedia - Pravenc.ru).
  12 марта (ст.ст.) 25 марта 2013 (нов. ст.). Русская Православная Церковь Отдел внешних церковных связей. (DECR).

March in the Eastern Orthodox calendar